Yejju Subba Rao (born 3 August 1981), known as Subba is an Indian professional volleyball player. 
President of Volleyball Federation of India honored Y Subba Rao with Five Gold coins for his extraordinary contribution towards Indian volleyball. In the last one and a half decade Subba Rao was awarded best player on numerous occasions. The Andhra Pradesh Government has honored him by allotting a plot of land at his home town Nellore.

Awards

Individuals
 2003 Asian Championship "Most Valuable Player"
 2003 Asian Championship "Best Spiker"
 2003 Asian Championship "Best Blocker"
 2005 Asian Championship "Best Blocker"

References

1981 births
Living people
Indian men's volleyball players
Volleyball players at the 2002 Asian Games
Volleyball players at the 2006 Asian Games
Place of birth missing (living people)
Asian Games competitors for India
Volleyball players from Andhra Pradesh
People from Nellore